Elijah Mdolomba  was an African politician. He was the Secretary-General of the African National Congress from 1930 to 1936.

References

African National Congress politicians